Ronaldo Nazario Córdoba Welch (born 11 February 1998) is a Panamanian professional football forward who last played for Sporting San Miguelito in the Liga Panameña.

He made his debut for Chepo on 27 July 2015 in a 2–5 Liga Panameña home loss to San Miguelito.

International career
He made his international debut for Panama on 18 February 2016 in a friendly match against El Salvador.

References

 
 

Living people
1998 births
Panamanian footballers
Panama international footballers
Panama youth international footballers
Association football forwards
Chepo FC players
Santa Gema F.C. players
Tauro F.C. players
Sporting San Miguelito players
Costa del Este F.C. players
Liga Panameña de Fútbol players
Sportspeople from Panama City